Ernest Marshal Frazer Howse (September 29, 1902 – February 1, 1993) was the 21st Moderator of the United Church of Canada from 1964 to 1966. Howse was born in Newfoundland in 1902 and studied in both Canada and Scotland before becoming the pastor of Beverly Hills Presbyterian Church in California. He returned to Canada in 1935 to become the minister at Westminster United Church. Located in central Winnipeg Westminster served some of the poorest areas of Canada during the Great Depression. Howse became a prominent advocate the social gospel movement. He also believed in a very liberal view of Christianity. For example, he did not believe in the physical resurrection of Jesus. In 1948 he moved to Toronto to become minister at Bloor Street United Church, a position he would retain until his retirement in 1970. After his retirement he became a regular writer on faith matters for the Toronto Star until 1979. Howse was also active in the World Council of Churches. In 1954 he was one of 25 Christian leaders from around to world who met in Lebanon with 25 Muslim leaders to improve interfaith dialogue. He was later elected co-president of the WCC's committee on Muslim-Christian Co-operation.
He was married to Ester Howse and had three children: Margery, David and George. Grandfather to: Scott, Kate (Margery), Andrew and Jennifer (David), Rachel, Julie, and Deborah (George).

References

"Very Rev. Ernest Howse headed United Church." Kitchener - Waterloo Record. Feb 2, 1993. pg. A.11
"Rev. Ernest Howse, 90 outspoken moderator." Michael McAteer Toronto Star. Feb 02, 1993. pg. A.4

Moderators of the United Church of Canada
1993 deaths
1902 births
People from Newfoundland (island)
Ministers of the United Church of Canada
People of the World Council of Churches